Christie Park is a sportsground located in the Northern Suburbs Sydney suburb of Macquarie Park. Christie Park is the home to FNSW NPL team, NWS Spirit FC.

The park is owned by Ryde Council and leased to North West Sydney Football (formerly GHFA). The ground is used for semi-professional competitions such as NPL and WNPL. It is also used for the amateur men's & women's competition run by NWSF.

Christie Park is also the home of the local refereeing association the North West Sydney Football Referees Association (NWSFRA).

External links
NWSF Official Website
Gladsville Hornsby Football Referees Association Website

Soccer venues in Sydney
Culture of Sydney